The 1972 Queensland state election was held on 27 May 1972.

Retiring members
Note: Albert Liberal MLA Bill Heatley, Balonne Country MLA Harold Hungerford and Callide Country MLA Vince Jones had died prior to the election, while Bowen Liberal MLA Peter Delamothe had resigned; no by-elections had been held to replace them.

Labor
Eric Lloyd MLA (Kedron)

Country
Sir David Nicholson MLA (Murrumba)
Sir Harold Richter MLA (Somerset)
John Row MLA (Hinchinbrook)

Democratic Labor
Les Diplock MLA (Aubigny)

Candidates
Sitting members at the time of the election are shown in bold text.

See also
 1972 Queensland state election
 Members of the Queensland Legislative Assembly, 1969–1972
 Members of the Queensland Legislative Assembly, 1972–1974
 List of political parties in Australia

References
 

Candidates for Queensland state elections